Prasophyllum sphacelatum, commonly known as the subalpine leek orchid, is a species of orchid endemic to south-eastern Australia. It has a single tubular, dull green leaf and up to eighteen scented, green to brownish flowers with a green to pinkish labellum. It grows in subalpine areas of New South Wales, Victoria and Tasmania.

Description
As with others in the genus, the flowers are inverted so that the labellum is above the column rather than below it. Flowering occurs from December to February.

Taxonomy and naming
Prasophyllum sphacelatum was first formally described in 1996 by David Jones from a specimen collected near Tantangara Dam in the Kosciuszko National Park and the description was published in Muelleria. The specific epithet (sphacelatum) is "derived from the Greek, sphakelos, necrosis, mortification, describing the withered leaf tip at anthesis".

Distribution and habitat
The subalpine leek orchid grows in subalpine herbfield and grassland, sometimes with grasses and shrubs in snow gum (Eucalyptus pauciflora) forest. It is found in sulalpine regions of New South Wales south from the Brindabella Range, in north-eastern Victoria and in Tasmania where it often grows on buttongrass plains.

References

External links 
 
 

sphacelatum
Flora of New South Wales
Flora of Victoria (Australia)
Flora of Tasmania
Endemic orchids of Australia
Plants described in 1996